The Stillwater Marathon was a race run in Stillwater, Minnesota, from 2009 to 2011. The race was put on by St. Croix Events.

The race featured a scenic, hilly course near the St. Croix River and took place in late May. The race had more than 500 people sign up in 2009, but faced strong competition in the area with other marathons. Although the marathon ceased, several a half-marathons still take place in Stillwater.

Marathon Course 
The race started near the Stillwater Lift Bridge, went south through Bayport, Minnesota, down the St. Croix River on the side of Minnesota State Highway 95 for five miles. It turned back on Stagecoach Trail and went west into Stillwater. Runners passed McKusick Lake and Otto Berg Park before going north, then downhill, and finishing near the lift bridge.

Race Weekend 
The race organizers ran the marathon, a 20-mile race, a half-marathon and a 12K.

Race Results 

Key:

References

External links 

 Official website
 Results

Foot races in Minnesota
Marathons in the United States
Stillwater, Minnesota